The grey-headed bristlebill (Bleda canicapillus) is a species of songbird in the bulbul family, Pycnonotidae. It is found in West Africa. Its natural habitats are subtropical or tropical dry forests, subtropical or tropical moist lowland forests, and subtropical or tropical swamps.

Taxonomy and systematics
The grey-headed bristlebill was originally described in the genus Trichophorus (a synonym for Criniger).

Subspecies
Two subspecies are recognized:
 B. c. canicapillus - (Hartlaub, 1854): Found from Guinea-Bissau to south-western Cameroon
 B. c. morelorum - Érard, 1991: Found in Senegal and Gambia

References

External links

grey-headed bristlebill
Birds of West Africa
grey-headed bristlebill
Taxonomy articles created by Polbot